Amirbek Juraboev (born 13 April 1996) is a Tajik professional footballer who will play as a midfielder for Malaysia Super League club Kedah Darul Aman.

Career

Club
After leaving Shakhtyor Soligorsk, Juraboev went on trial with Belshina Bobruisk, but did not earn a contract.

In June 2016, Juraboev signed for FC Istiklol from Barki Tajik.

On 26 July 2019, Juraboev left Istiklol to join PFC Navbahor Namangan on a six-month contract.

On 7 August 2020, Juraboev returned to FC Istiklol, signing a one-year contract with the club.

On 10 March 2022, Juraboev left Istiklol to join United City in the Philippines Football League.

On 10 December 2022, Juraboev was officially signed by a Malaysia Super League club, Kedah Darul Aman, for 20th season of the league.

International
Juraboev made his senior team debut on 7 June 2014 against Estonia.

Career statistics

Club

International

Statistics accurate as of match played 25 September 2022

Honors
Istiklol
 Tajik League (6): 2016, 2017, 2018, 2019, 2020, 2021
 Tajik Cup (2): 2016, 2018
 Tajik Supercup (2): 2018, 2019

United City
 Copa Paulino Alcantara (1): 2022

Tajikistan
King's Cup: 2022

References

External links
 
 

1996 births
Living people
Tajikistani footballers
Association football midfielders
Tajikistan international footballers
Asian Games competitors for Tajikistan
Footballers at the 2014 Asian Games
FC Istiklol players
FC Shakhtyor Soligorsk players
Navbahor Namangan players
Ceres–Negros F.C. players
Kedah Darul Aman F.C. players
Tajikistani expatriate footballers
Expatriate footballers in Belarus
Expatriate footballers in Uzbekistan
Expatriate footballers in the Philippines